The Defense Rests (or Take the Witness) is a 1934 American film directed by Lambert Hillyer and starring Jack Holt, Jean Arthur, and Nat Pendleton. The movie was produced in May 1934 and released on 15 July 1934.

Cast

Jack Holt as Matthew Mitchell
Jean Arthur as Joan Hayes
Nat Pendleton as Rocky
Arthur Hohl as James Randolph
Raymond Walburn as Austin
Harold Huber as Castro
Robert Gleckler as Gentry
Sarah Padden as Mrs. Evans 
Shirley Grey as Mabel Wilson
Donald Meek as Fogg
Raymond Hatton as Nick
Ward Bond as Good
John Wray as Cooney
Vivian Oakland as Mrs. Ballou
Selmer Jackson as Duffy 
J. Carrol Naish as Ballou 
Samuel S. Hinds as	Dean Adams
Lydia Knott as Patient

Reception

"The story is interestingly woven and its telling is sufficiently swift to hold the visitor's interest," wrote The New York Times. "Mr. Holt and Miss Arthur are about as usual, which is to say they do all that can be reasonably expected of their rôles. Nat Pendleton as Rocky, Mitchell's bodyguard, comes through with the comic relief."

References

External links

1934 films
1934 romantic drama films
American romantic drama films
American black-and-white films
Columbia Pictures films
Films directed by Lambert Hillyer
Films with screenplays by Jo Swerling
Films produced by Robert North
1930s English-language films
1930s American films